Sarab-e Elyas (also Romanized as Sarāb-e Elyās, Sarab ‘Alīwās, and Sarb ‘Alīwās) is a village in Beyranvand-e Jonubi Rural District, Bayravand District, Khorramabad County, Lorestan Province, Iran. At the 2006 census, its population was 516, in 103 families.

References 

Towns and villages in Khorramabad County